Gioele Celerino (born 4 October 1993) is an Italian professional rugby league footballer who plays for the Saint-Gaudens Bears in the Elite One Championship and Italy at international level. 

Playing career
At the time of the 2013 World Cup, Celerino was playing for the North West Roosters. He was the only Italian-born player selected in the World Cup squad, and one of only two players selected from the Italian domestic competition (alongside Fabrizio Ciaurro). Celerino did not feature in a World Cup match, but did play in Italy's non-Test friendly against England prior to the start of the tournament.

On 25 January 2016, it was announced that Celerino had signed with the semi-professional Newcastle Thunder in England's third-tier League 1 competition.

In July 2017, Celerino moved to Australia to play with the Tully Tigers in the amateur Cairns District Rugby League. In October 2017, Celerino was named in Italy's squad for the 2017 World Cup. In 2018, Celerino joined his Italian teammate Terry Campese at the Queanbeyan Blues.

References

External links
(archived by web.archive.org) Statistics at rlwc2017.com
Italy profile

1993 births
Living people
Italian rugby league players
Italy national rugby league team captains
Italy national rugby league team players
Newcastle Thunder players
North West Roosters players
Palau Broncos players
People from Asti
Rugby league second-rows
South Wales Scorpions players
Sportspeople from the Province of Asti